Caroline in the City is an American television sitcom that ran on the NBC television network from 1995 until 1999. It stars Lea Thompson as cartoonist Caroline Duffy, who lives in Manhattan. The rest of the cast includes Eric Lutes, Malcolm Gets, Amy Pietz, and Andy Lauer. The series premiered on September 21, 1995, in the "Must See TV" Thursday night block between Seinfeld and ER and ran for 97 episodes over four seasons before it was cancelled; the final episode was broadcast on April 26, 1999. The series' rights are currently held by CBS Television Distribution.

Summary
Caroline Duffy (Lea Thompson), a cartoonist who lives in Manhattan, spends a lot of time with dates and lovers, and meddles in the lives of her friends and neighbors. In the pilot episode, she has broken up with Del Cassidy (Eric Lutes), who quickly finds another date. She hires Richard Karinsky (Malcolm Gets) to be her new colorist, and he pretends to be her new boyfriend during a dinner to prevent her from being embarrassed over Del's moving on. During the first season, Richard develops feelings for Caroline.

Caroline's success as a cartoonist is displayed throughout the first season; her cartoon character gets a balloon in the Macy's Thanksgiving Day Parade, she has a park dedicated to her in her native Peshtigo, Wisconsin, and she even has an offer for a cereal brand. When she was a child, she drew violent pictures of her brother Chris, and after dropping out of college, she started doodling at a copywriting job. It took less than five years for her cartoon to become nationally syndicated, and she even appeared on The Today Show.

Towards the end of season one, Del proposes to Caroline. Richard is distressed by this, and searches for a new job. Although Richard has kept his feelings secret, their friends Annie (Amy Pietz) and Remo (Tom La Grua) figure out that he loves Caroline. The day before the wedding, Richard writes her a love letter where he asks Caroline to meet him at Remo's if she loves him. He leaves the letter in a pile of wedding thank-you cards. Caroline arrives at Remo's but does not mention the letter, and continues with the wedding plans. Richard decides to leave Manhattan. When Caroline and Del call off the wedding, Caroline visits Richard's apartment but he has left.

In the second season, Richard returns to Manhattan after having been in Paris where he had tried to sell paintings. Caroline gives the thank-you cards to a friend; Richard tries to find and destroy the love letter; he tosses it out of the window, only to have Annie find it. He resumes his old job as Caroline's colorist. Later, Caroline discovers that she has feelings for Richard; however, Richard has reunited with his former girlfriend Julia, whom he met in Manhattan. Caroline leaves a message on his answering machine telling him that she loves him, but Julia discovers it and erases it.

Richard and Julia get married which prompts a bitter love triangle among the three. Richard eventually splits with Julia.

Caroline and Richard eventually become a couple. However, they split after arguing over whether to have children; Richard learned that Julia had a child. In the final episode, which ends on an unresolved cliffhanger, Annie and Del are now in a new relationship, while Caroline is about to marry another man - her childhood friend Randy - when Richard shows up at the wedding.

Characters

Main
  (Lea Thompson) – Caroline is a cartoonist of the comic strip Caroline in the City. Originally from Peshtigo, Wisconsin, Caroline has a need for people to like her. She meddles in the lives of her friends and people around her, and often gets into trouble because of it. She initially breaks her engagement to Del Cassidy, but remains friends with him. She hires Richard Karinsky to be her colorist. Although Richard has feelings for Caroline, she does not realize or reciprocate until the end of the second season. She dates veterinarian Joe DeStefano in the second season, and former classmates Trevor and Randy in the third and fourth seasons. She becomes engaged to Randy, but her wedding ceremony is interrupted when Richard appears.
  (Malcolm Gets) – Richard is the colorist for the Caroline in the City comic strip. He is a struggling artist who usually lives in the slummy parts of New York City, and is regularly embarrassed about the nature of his job. He has several chances for a big break, but they end up in failure. He is also an excellent pianist.  He has a substantial student loan debt from attending an unnamed art school. He has a sarcastic personality, especially with Annie. He falls in love with Caroline during the first season, and does not think highly of Del Cassidy and his lack of intelligence. Eventually he and Caroline have a relationship.
  (Eric Lutes) – Del works at a greeting card company owned by his father, and manages the Caroline in the City comic strip card products. He is Caroline's sometimes boyfriend; they get engaged during the first season, but break it off in the season finale. After receiving one too many insults from his callous father, Del quits to build his own business, Eagle Greeting Cards. In the fourth season, he sells the business to a large entertainment conglomerate.
  (Amy Pietz) – Annie is Caroline's across the hall neighbor and her best friend. She is a dancer in the Broadway production of Cats. She is somewhat promiscuous and this makes her a constant target for Richard's wisecracks. After Richard writes Caroline a love letter which he later regrets, Annie comes across the letter and uses it to blackmail him until her sister uses it for a song. After meeting Shadoe Stevens in Los Angeles, she quits her job and rushes to California to shoot a television pilot. Unfortunately, the pilot is not picked up, and she becomes unemployed.
  (Andy Lauer) – He is a delivery boy in Del's father's company, and after Del is fired, they become partners in new company Eagle Greeting Cards. He constantly wears roller blades, even when he is not making deliveries.  He has a poor grasp on reality. In the last season, he moves to Europe.

Recurring
 Remo (Tom La Grua) – Remo owns the Italian restaurant, Remo's Ristorante, where the main characters usually hang out.
 Gianni (John Mariano) – A waiter at Remo's Ristorante.
 Joe DeStefano (Mark Feuerstein) – A veterinarian who dated Caroline, and came close to moving into her apartment. However, after he tells Caroline that he slept with his ex-girlfriend, he and Caroline split.
 Julia Mazzone Karinsky (Sofia Milos) – Richard's former girlfriend and love of Richard's life (as he calls it 'sincero amore' – the love that one does not have to question). She first met Richard in Italy, and during the third season, they get married. Her father, an Italian businessman, does not approve of their relationship and tries to destroy Richard, first physically, then economically.
 Trevor (Robert Gant) – Trevor is Caroline's boyfriend during the third season. He owns a computer company and has a German shepherd dog. When Caroline rushes to Spain to meet Richard and Julia, Trevor realizes that he will never win a place in Caroline's heart.
 Randy (Anthony Tyler Quinn) – Randy is a pediatrician and schoolmate of Caroline from Peshtigo, Wisconsin. He initially reunites with Caroline during the fourth season; he buys Caroline's parents' house, but agrees to sell it to Caroline and rent it from her. When he arrives in New York for the pediatricians seminar they meet again, and Caroline realizes that she harbors some feelings for him, even though she is in a relationship with Richard. After Richard goes to Italy to take care of his son, Annie brings Randy to cheer Caroline up, and he falls in love with Caroline. They have a wedding in the final episode.
 Angie Spadaro (Candice Azzara) – Annie's mother who regularly visits Annie's flat and drives her crazy. She gets divorced in the third season.
 Pete Spadaro (Adam Ferrara) – Annie's brother who worked at their father's undertaking company. He is influenced by Richard to try some other occupations including an electrician and a painter.
 Shelly (Lauren Graham) – Richard's short-term girlfriend. Richard was desperate to break up with her, but she always had a reason not to.
 Elevator Lady (Cathy Ladman) – Caroline's neighbor from one of the upper floors. She often appears in key dialogues when someone enters the elevator.
 Peter Welmerling (Peter Krause) -  Someone Caroline knew from her home town who goes to the opera with her on a date.

Notable guests
This is a list of the notable guest stars in the series. Some of them appear as their characters from related NBC series that aired around the same time.

Episodes

Background/production 
The show was filmed at the CBS Studio Center in Los Angeles, California.

Illustrations and animations 
Bonnie Timmons drew the illustrations and animations that are supposed to represent Caroline's eponymous in-show comic strip.

Connections with other sitcoms

Connections with Frasier 

Though not officially a companion show to Frasier, Caroline in the City exists in the same universe (so likely also connects to both Cheers and Wings as well) with several crossovers and connections. Not only does the end of one early Season 1 episode feature Frasier characters, Daphne and Niles, in Frasier's apartment (filmed on Frasier'''s set and guest-starring Jane Leeves and David Hyde Pierce as their characters) looking at a Caroline in the City cartoon, but lead Eric Lutes played Frasier's boss Tom Duran in two episodes. David Hyde Pierce also appears a second time as another character, this time playing an IRS man who dreams of being in Cats.  Dan Butler (Bulldog in Frasier) had a recurring role as a museum owner, plus Frasier actors Harriet Sansom Harris (Bebe) and Edward Hibbert (Gil) appear in the same Season 3 episode as each other, playing different characters (and not sharing any scenes). Additionally, Scott Atkinson (who portrayed Daphne's ex-boyfriend, Clive, in a Frasier episode) also appears playing Caroline's love interest in one episode.

 Connection with Friends 

Matthew Perry appears as his Friends character Chandler Bing (not named but implied to be him and advertised by the network as such in their crossover promotions) in the episode "Caroline and the Folks" in a crossover appearance in which Annie meets Chandler at the video store. The same night, Lea Thompson appeared as Caroline Duffy (also never named as such but implied to be - and advertised as - her character) in the November 2, 1995, Friends episode "The One with the Baby on the Bus".

 Connection with The Single Guy 

In the same episode - "Caroline and the Folks" - which featured Chandler from Friends, Jonathan Silverman also appeared, playing his character Jonathan Eliot (again not named but advertised as such) from the sitcom The Single Guy''.

Broadcast

Reception

Ratings

Home media
CBS DVD (distributed by Paramount) released the first two seasons on DVD in Region 1 in 2008/2009.  A decade later, the remaining two seasons were both released (though lacking episodes) in Region 1 on August 6, 2019.

In Region 2, Revelation Films released all four seasons on DVD between August 2005 and June 2006.

In Region 4, Visual Entertainment has released the first two seasons on DVD in Australia.

References

External links
 
 

1990s American sitcoms
1995 American television series debuts
1999 American television series endings
NBC original programming
English-language television shows
Fictional cartoonists
Television shows about comics
Television series by CBS Studios
Television shows set in Manhattan